The ara (Niphon spinosus), otherwise known as the saw-edged perch or the Dageumbari (다금바리) is a species of marine ray-finned fish from the monospecific genus Niphon which is in the monotypic tribe of the Niphonini which is part of the subfamily Epinephelinae of the family Serranidae, the groupers and sea basses. The tribe Niphonini is the sister to the other four tribes of Epinephelinae and it has been posited that it represents a basal lineage within this subfamily. The ara was first formally described in 1828 by Georges Cuvier in the Histoire naturelle des poissons which he co-authored with Achille Valenciennes, the type locality was given as the Sea of Japan.

References

Epinephelinae
Fish described in 1828
Taxa named by Georges Cuvier